Ellychnia facula is a species of firefly in the genus Ellychnia. It is widespread across North America.

References

Lampyridae
Beetles described in 1857